Budhiana is a census town in Jalandhar district of Punjab State, India. The village is administrated by a sarpanch who is an elected representative of village as per Panchayati raj (India). ਬੁਧਿਆਣਾ ਭਾਰਤ ਦੇ ਪੰਜਾਬ ਰਾਜ ਦੇ ਜਲੰਧਰ ਜ਼ਿਲ੍ਹੇ ਦਾ ਇੱਕ ਜਨਗਣਨਾ ਵਾਲਾ ਸ਼ਹਿਰ ਹੈ। ਇਹ ਜਲੰਧਰ ਤੋਂ 17 ਕਿਲੋਮੀਟਰ (11 ਮੀਲ), ਫਗਵਾੜਾ ਤੋਂ 20 ਕਿਲੋਮੀਟਰ (12 ਮੀਲ), ਜ਼ਿਲ੍ਹਾ ਹੇਏ ਤੋਂ 34 ਕਿਲੋਮੀਟਰ (21 ਮੀਲ) ਦੂਰ ਸਥਿਤ ਹੈ।

Transport 
Bolina Doaba is the nearest railway station. Jalandhar city and Jalandhar Cantt, railway stations are the next nearest train stations. There is daily bus service from village to Jalandhar City and to the nearest bus connecting routes including Jandu Singha.

See also
List of villages in India

References

External links
List of villages in Jalandhar district at Census of India, 2011

Villages in Jalandhar district